Michael or Mike Christie may refer to:

Michael Christie (conductor) (born 1974), American conductor
Mike Christie (director), British film and TV director
Michael Christie (field hockey) (born 1987), Scottish field hockey player
Michael Christie (golfer) (1969–2004), American golfer
Mike Christie (ice hockey) (1949–2019), ice hockey defenceman
Mike Christie (singer) (born 1981), baritone singer with British vocal troupe G4
Michael Christie (writer) (born 1976), Canadian short story writer